Ray Sampson (born 12 November 1949) is a former Australian rules footballer who played with Melbourne in the Victorian Football League (VFL). 

His older brother Brian Sampson also played in the VFL for Essendon.

Notes

External links 		

Profile at Demonwiki

		
1949 births
Living people
Australian rules footballers from Victoria (Australia)		
Melbourne Football Club players